The Reality Tour was the second concert tour by American recording artist Jessica Simpson. Predominately visiting the United States, the tour supported Simpson's third studio album, In This Skin (2003). According to the singer, the title derives from her recent success on the  reality TV series, Newlyweds: Nick and Jessica, while showcasing her music on a natural level. The tour began in Chula Vista in May and ended in October in West Springfield.

Despite early reports of poor ticket sales, Simpson's tour became one of the biggest summer tours in North America.

To date, the tour serves as Simpson's last major concert tour. The tour ranked number 86 on Pollstar's "Top 100 Tours 2004", earning over seven million dollars out of 41 shows.

Background
While promoting the re-release of her album, Simpson stated in several interviews the possibility of a tour, wanting to break away from filming her TV series and connect with her fans. The tour was officially announced in May 2004 through various media outlets, with sponsorship from Ice Breakers and Proactiv Solution.

During an interview with the Associated Press, the singer says she wanted the concerts to focus on her music and her personality. Onstage, Simpson was joined by a seven-piece band, with no dancers or choreography for the show. Simpson would perform songs from her three current albums, while providing anecdotes about her life and the songs. Unseen footage from her reality series and variety show (entitled The Nick and Jessica Variety Hour) were included in the show as well. Each night, the singer dedicated "I Have Loved You" to the American armed forces and conduct a Q&A session with contest winners.
 
Before the tour commenced, Simpson performed at several radio-sponsored music festivals including: Your Show, Wango Tango, Summer Music Mania, Zootopia, Kiss Concert, Last Chance Summer Dance, and Play Safe in the Park.
 
To introduce the tour, Simpson stated:"This is definitely a big tour for me. I'm a little nervous. It's like you're a little shaky about will I sell tickets to such a big market? […] But it's cool to put together such a huge production. And we're calling it the 'Reality Tour', from the show ['Newlyweds']. And there'll be all kinds of stuff showing never-seen clips and just kind of putting my personality into the tour, which will be a lot of fun."

Opening acts
Ryan Cabrera (Leg 1)
Cherie (Salt Lake City)
Shifty Shellshock (Salt Lake City)

Set list
"I Think I'm in Love with You"
"A Little Bit"
"Forbidden Fruit"
"I Have Loved You"
"She Works Hard for the Money"
"Take My Breath Away"
"Angels"
"Be"
"Everyday See You"
"You Don't Have To Let Go"
"My Way Home"
"Loving You"
"Sweetest Sin"
"I Wanna Love You Forever"
"Irresistible"
Encore
"With You"

Tour dates

Festivals and other miscellaneous performances

This concert was a part of "KHTS-FM's Channel 93.3 concert"
This concert was a part of "KIIS-FM Wango Tango"
This concert was a part of "Summer Music Mania"
This concert was a part of "Z-100 Zootopia" 
This concert was part of "Play Safe in the Park" 
This concert was a part of "KISS-108 FM"
This concert was a part of "Summerfest"
This concert was a part of "Q Concert"
This concert was a part of "97.1 ZHT Birthday Bash"
This concert was a part of the "Orange County Fair"
This concert was a part of the "Budweiser Grandstand Concert Series"

Cancellations and rescheduled shows

Broadcasts and recordings
Rehearsals and select performances from the tour were seen on Simpson's MTV show and her sister's show, The Ashlee Simpson Show. The show was filmed at the Universal Amphitheatre for DVD release. The DVD was released in November 2004 and omitted the performances of "A Little Bit", 'She Works Hard for the Money" and "I Wanna Love You Forever". The set featured the music video for "Angels" along with a behind the scenes look at the making of the video. The DVD showed strong sales within its first week and was certified platinum by the RIAA, recognizing shipments exceeding 100,000 copies.

Critical reception
Overall, the tour received mixed reviews from music critics. Many applaud Simpson's onstage persona but felt the show itself felt unfinished. Jim Farber (New York Daily News) felt Simpson's vocals during her show at the Radio City Music Hall were "overdramatic". He followed with, "Not that Simpson didn't give it her all as a singer. Pulling a Mariah Carey, she belted every note to the rafters. While she clearly lacks Ms. Carey's pipes, a gross excess of amplification, and some apparently recorded vocal helper, allowed her to simulate diva-status. Too bad the songs from her three CDs all sound like pieces fished out of Britney Spears slush pile". Dustin J. Seibert (The Cincinnati Enquirer) felt the singer's concert at the Riverbend Music Center was "honest and warm" He elaborates, "Simpson's reliance on her high-octane voice and bubbly personality set her apart from some of her pop counterparts. Her shows featured no pyrotechnics or funky choreography, just her butter-melting octave range over a smooth six-piece band and two backup singers".

Neva Chonin (San Francisco Chronicle) criticized Simpson's vocal performance at the Shoreline Amphitheatre. She writes, "A rendition of Berlin's 'Take My Breath Away', dedicated to her husband, sounded like an ode to autoerotic asphyxiation. [...] With her band successfully drowning out her tuneful but wispy vocals, Simpson led sing-alongs for anesthetized funk number 'The Sweetest Sin' and an encore of 'With You'". Joey Guerra (Houston Chronicle) admired Simpson's personality during her performance at the Toyota Center; but felt the singer's concert was "uneven". He explains, "Her material is also a bit thin to sustain a full concert. Many album tracks began to sound alike after a while, and her few certifiable hits popped up late in the evening. 'Irresistible' came at the end of the show, and the feel-good anthem 'With You' was the expected encore. Even odder was the omission of 'I Wanna Love You Forever', Simpson's breakthrough single."

References

External links
Simpson's Official Website

2004 concert tours